The Patalganga River is a river that rises in the steep western scarps of the Matheran uplands where it branches off from the main ridge near Khopoli and maintains a general westward flow till it joins the Dharamtar Creek with a wide estuary. The tail-waters of the Khopoli power project are let into the river near Khopoli in Maharashtra, India. It comes at foremost in terms of pollution. It is one of the most polluted rivers of Maharashtra, source being from Patalganga MIDC. Industries in Patalganga MIDC include (see the site). These companies contribute polluting the river. MPCB provides no proper data regarding water quality which is a point which limits the protests from various NGO's and locals. Nowadays, locals from villages on banks of patalganga river (Turade, Kalivali, Apta, Dushmi, Kharpada, Rave) complain about the poisoning caused by consuming fishes. Biodiversity of the river is under serious threat due to the harmful chemicals from the dyeing, fertilizer, pesticides, insecticides, alkyl amines industries. Effect of pollution on farming: Crops get burnt due to highly acidic pH of water. Flooding during rainy season results in the flushing of agricultural lands downstream with harmful chemicals which makes land unsuitable for cultivation.

Industries have their effluents released  after the Chawne dam (Bandhara, small level built for water supply, was used until recently before construction of Hetawane dam).
Mostly at dawn or dusk effluents are released without treating (possible by bribing officers of midc and mpcb).

History
In Mahabharatha, when Bhishm was about to die, Arjuna is said to have extracted groundwater, namely, Patalganga, by shooting an arrow which made a hole in the ground and created a fountain.

According to the Puranas, there are three tributaries of the River Ganges and they are Swarga Ganga (Mandakini), Bhoo Ganga (Bhagirathi) and Patal Ganga (Bhagvati). Before entering into the sea, the Ganges divides into several tributaries and then merges into the Bay of Bengal.

The Patalganga river has been mentioned in ancient vedic texts and the temples in Turade-Karade area and its banks were considered holy and a dip in the river is considered spiritually beneficial to mention the least. Bhawanipatna is close to Patalganga, a natural Hot spring worshipped as the holy river Ganges by the locals and worshippers.

Patalganga a huge industrial area, MIDC near Karjat and Panvel has got its name from the Patalganga River. To facilitate traffic, for entrepreneurs of the industrial area, a two lane high level bridge has been built-up on river Patalganga.

Course

The Patalganga river has its source in the Khandala portion of the Sahyadri scarp. On the south the Manikgarh  forms a steep range with a north-north-west and south-south-east: trend; it is in fact a projection of the hill and plateau complex that separates the Patalganga and the Balganga drainage. Hilly topography persists, but the river valley is broader and merges into the tidal flats of the Dharamtar creek. The Balganga river is a tributary stream of the Patalganga only nominally as it flows almost parallel though in a more hilly region, and joins the Patalganga only in the Dharamtar creek; the land is hilly but generally the ranges like the Shillote and Badruddin are lower in height.

References

External links
  Classification of Waters of Patalganga River Basin-Source-Government of Maharashtra, India
  Patalganga river cripples Mumbai industrial units-Source-The Hindu Business Line

Rivers of Maharashtra
Geography of Raigad district
Rivers of India
Rivers of the Western Ghats